Siddonsburg is an unincorporated community in Monaghan Township, York County, Pennsylvania, United States. The community is located in about 2 miles south of Messiah College.
Siddonsburg was originally named Siddonstown. Siddonstown was established by Benjamin Siddons.

References

Unincorporated communities in York County, Pennsylvania
Unincorporated communities in Pennsylvania